Bashirabad (also Romanized as Bashīrābād; also known as Cheshmeh-ye Jowhar Bīshīrābād and Cheshmeh-ye Jowhar Shīrābād) is a village in Jamrud Rural District, in the Central District of Torbat-e Jam County, Razavi Khorasan Province, Iran. At the 2006 census, its population was 339, in 91 families.

References 

Populated places in Torbat-e Jam County